This is a list of towns and villages in County Dublin, Ireland, many of which are suburbs of Dublin city.

A
 Adamstown
 Artane
 Ashtown
 Athgoe

B
 Balbriggan
 Baldoyle
 Balgriffin
 Ballinteer
 Ballsbridge
 Ballyboden
 Ballybrack
 Ballybough
 Ballyboughal
 Ballyfermot
 Ballygall
 Ballymount
 Ballymun
 Ballyroan
 Balrothery
 Bayside
 Beaumont
 Belfield
 Blackrock
 Blanchardstown
 Bluebell
 Bohernabreena
 Booterstown
 Brittas
 Broadstone

C
 Cabinteely
 Cabra
 Carrickmines
 Castleknock
 Chapelizod
 Cherrywood
 Cherry Orchard
 Churchtown
 Citywest
 Clondalkin
 Clongriffin
 Clonsilla
 Clonskeagh
 Clontarf
 Clonturk
 Coolmine
 Coolock
 Corduff
 Cornelscourt
 Crumlin

D
 Dalkey
 Damastown
 Darndale
 Dartry
 Deansgrange
 Dollymount
 Dolphin's Barn
 Donabate
 Donaghmede
 Donnybrook
 Donnycarney
 Drimnagh
 Drumcondra
 Dún Laoghaire
 Dundrum

E
 East Wall
 Edmondstown

F
 Fairview
 Finglas
 Firhouse
 Foxrock

G
 Garristown
 Glasnevin
 Glasthule
 Glencullen
 Glenageary
 Goatstown
 Grangegorman

H
 Harold's Cross
 Hollystown
 Howth

I
 Inchicore
 Irishtown
 Islandbridge

J
 Jobstown

K
 Kill O' The Grange
 Kilbarrack
 Killester
 Killiney
 Kilmacud
 Kilmainham
 Kilnamanagh
 Kilternan
 Kimmage
 Kinsealy
 Knocklyon

L
 Leopardstown
 The Liberties
 Loughlinstown
 Loughshinny
 Lucan
 Lusk

M
 Malahide
 Marino
 Merrion
 Milltown
 Monkstown
 Mount Merrion
 Mulhuddart

N
 Newcastle
 Naul
 North Strand
 North Wall

O
 Oldbawn
 Oldtown
 Ongar

P
 Palmerstown
 Phibsborough
 Poppintree
 Portmarnock
 Portobello
 Portrane

R
 Raheny
 Ranelagh
 Rathcoole
 Rathfarnham
 Rathgar
 Rathmichael
 Rathmines
 Rialto
 Ringsend
 Rolestown
 Rush

S
 Saggart
 Sallynoggin
 Sandycove
 Sandyford
 Sandymount
 Santry
 Shankill
 Skerries
 Smithfield
 Stepaside
 Stillorgan
 Stoneybatter
 Sutton
 Swords

T
 Tallaght
 Templeogue
 Terenure
 The Coombe
 Ticknock
 Tyrrelstown

W
 Walkinstown
 Whitechurch
 Whitehall
 Windy Arbour

See also
List of towns and villages in the Republic of Ireland

References

 
Towns and villages in Dublin (city)
Towns and villages in Dún Laoghaire–Rathdown
Towns and villages in Fingal
Towns and villages in South Dublin (county)
Towns and villages